Local elections will be held in Quezon City on May 9, 2016, within the Philippine general election. Registered voters of the city elected candidates for the following elective local posts: mayor, vice mayor, district representative, and six councilors at-large for each district. There are six legislative districts in the city.

Background
Incumbent City Mayor Herbert Bautista will be facing tight competition in the mayoralty elections against Leon Peralta, an advocate against Trapos (traditional politicians) and political dynasty, NGO worker Martin Sanchez, Jr. and radioman Alex Lague. Vice Mayor Joy Belmonte, who will seek a reelection, will faced four challengers, including radioman Rolando Jota, and businessmen Henry Samonte, Allan Bantilo and Glenn Nicanor Acol.

In the congressional race, only four Congressmen, Winnie Castelo, Jorge Banal, Alfred Vargas and Kit Belmonte will be running for reelection in the 2nd, 3rd, 5th and 6th districts, without any opponents. House Speaker Sonny Belmonte will faced up against Hadja Lorna Aquino and Hans Palacios in the 4th district. Incumbent representative Francisco Calalay and his predecessor Bingbong Crisologo will be tossed-up for the seat in the 1st district.

Candidates

Mayor

  

(*) Note: He was then considered by the Liberal Party to be part of their senatorial line-up but he decided to run instead as mayor.

Vice Mayor

Representative

1st District

2nd District

3rd District

4th District

5th District

6th District

Councilor

1st District
Note: Incumbent councilors Dorothy Delarmente and Ricardo Belmonte Jr are barred and cannot seek reelection. They will running for the party-list seat as the 1st and 2nd nominees of Serbisyo sa Bayan party-list, respectively.

|-bgcolor=black
|colspan=8|

2nd District 
Note: Incumbent councilor Roderick Paulate cannot seek reelection due to his perpetual disqualification in the public office.

|-bgcolor=black
|colspan=8|

3rd District
Note: Incumbent councilor Jaime Borres is not eligible for reelection.

 

|-bgcolor=black
|colspan=8|

4th District
Note: Incumbent councilors Vincent Belmonte and Atty. Bong Suntay are barred and cannot seek reelection. Incumbents Jessica Castelo Daza and Bayani Hipol will not run for reelection.

 

|-bgcolor=black
|colspan=8|

5th District

|-bgcolor=black
|colspan=8|

6th District
Note: Incumbent councilor Candy Medina is barred and cannot seek reelection.

 

 

|-bgcolor=black
|colspan=8|

References

2016 Philippine local elections
Elections in Quezon City
Politics of Quezon City
2016 elections in Metro Manila